1997–98 was the 36th season in the history of SD Compostela, and their fourth in La Liga.

Season summary

Compostela parted company with head coach Fernando Vázquez in March 1998, with the club in the relegation playoff places. Gabriel Leis coached the team for the rest of the season, but couldn't save them, and they ended the year in 17th place. They faced Villarreal in the relegation playoff, where a 0–0 draw at El Madrigal and a 1–1 draw at San Lázaro saw them lose on away goals. They were relegated back to the Segunda División after four years in La Liga.

In the Copa del Rey they made it to the third round before being beaten 3–2 on aggregate by Segunda División side, and eventual semifinalists, Deportivo Alavés.

Squad

Left club during season

Squad stats
Last updated on 9 March 2021.

|-
|colspan="14"|Players who have left the club after the start of the season:

|}

La Liga

See also
SD Compostela
1997–98 La Liga
1997–98 Copa del Rey

References

SD Compostela seasons
Compostela